Helmut Morbitzer (born 25 September 1955) is an Austrian former equestrian. He competed in two events at the 1996 Summer Olympics.

References

External links
 

1955 births
Living people
Austrian male equestrians
Olympic equestrians of Austria
Equestrians at the 1996 Summer Olympics
People from Kirchdorf an der Krems District
Sportspeople from Upper Austria